Acquasanta Terme is a comune (municipality) in the Province of Ascoli Piceno in the Italian region Marche, located about  south of Ancona and about  southwest of Ascoli Piceno. It is located in the Gran Sasso e Monti della Laga National Park.

History
In June 1883, a coin hoard was discovered by chance in S. Maria del Paggese, within the municipality of Acquasanta Terme, today S. Maria di Acquasanta Terme. The hoard was in a terracotta pot and contained c. 275 denarii dated between the second half of the 1st century and the beginning of the 3rd century AD. A brief announcement of the discovery was made by the Inspector of Excavations and Monuments in Ascoli Piceno, Giulio Gabrielli, and published in the local newspaper Corriere Piceno.

Main sights
Medieval castle Castel di Luco (14th century), characterized by an unusual elliptical plan.
Ponte di Quintodecimo and Ponte Romano, Roman bridges crossing which were part of the Via Salaria.

References

Cities and towns in the Marche